A list of the characters appearing in the Chaos Walking Trilogy, comprising The Knife of Never Letting Go, The Ask and the Answer, and Monsters of Men, by Patrick Ness. Alliances and factions evolve throughout the series; the following list is divided into groups as they are at the beginning of the war.

Main characters

Todd Hewitt
Todd Hewitt is the protagonist of the series. When the trilogy begins, he is one month shy of turning thirteen. (Note that New World follows a thirteen-month calendar, meaning he is actually about fourteen Earth/Old World years at the beginning of the series.) Brought up by his adoptive parents, Ben and Cillian, Todd was kept unaware of Prentisstown’s history until the end of the first book.

Mayor Prentiss prevented Todd from gaining an education, and consequently, Todd’s narrative is illiterate and unrestricted. He cannot read or write, a problem that has prevented him from reading his mother’s diary and communicating with Viola from the scout ship in book three. His voice has been described as "science fiction's Huckleberry Finn."

In The Ask and the Answer, Todd is forced to follow the Mayor's commands in his militaristic regime, The Ask. He first commits acts of cruelty against Spackle (branding them), but later on the Mayor enforces the same acts on women. This raises questions about the justification of actions when the perpetrator is 'following orders'. Without Viola, he starts to become colder and emotionally detached from the dire situation. He is at first forced to do so because Viola is under the Mayor’s control, but as the novel progresses, Todd starts to lose who he really is. It is only until Mayor Prentiss reveals his plans that Todd sees he must fight him to save Viola, and New Prentisstown.

Throughout the novels, Todd is repeatedly pressured to murder another human being in order to fulfil Mayor Prentiss’ plans. However, his character is labelled unable to kill, until the end of The Ask and The Answer, where his noise reveals that he would kill for Viola. This then leads him to participate in war, and he has since killed many Spackle in self-defence, though has not killed any men. In Monsters of Men, Todd’s character encounters further challenges. When spending time with the Mayor, the two develop a link (denoted by a small humming in their Noise). Todd gains control over his Noise, thus allowing him to silence it, use it as a weapon, learn with it, and use it to control other people. However, in the end it is revealed that by silencing one’s Noise, the attack power of the Noise is decreased. Todd ends up trusting the Mayor again, and saves him unconsciously from death several times. However, when Ben shows up, Todd's bond with the Mayor breaks. The skills taught to him ultimately allow Todd to defeat the Mayor in a battle using only his Noise.

The Sky, 1017, mortally wounds Todd near the end of Monsters of Men, mistaking Todd for the Mayor, though he admits that he wasn’t sure when he fired his weapon. Todd’s Noise leaves, returning in small bursts, and he remains in a coma-like state at the end of book three. However, the final chapter hints that he will wake so long as Viola keeps ‘calling’ him.

A short story released in May 2013 reveals that Todd has awoken from his coma, but no further details have been provided.

Viola Eade

Viola Eade had recently turned thirteen (twelve-month calendar) when she crash-landed on New World with her parents. She was the sole survivor of the crash; her father perished in the fire that caused the crash, while her mother lived for only a few moments following it. She and her family were part of a scouting party sent ahead by a group of new settlers. Her mother was the best pilot on the ship while her father was a skilled engineer of their settlers' spacecraft, the Delta.

Her looks are not described explicitly in the novels, the only description being that her hair is short and that her skin is pale. Later on in the 1st book, Viola is described as being smaller than Todd. She was one of the top students on the Delta (out of all the caretaker families' children) and was taught how to survive on the new planet. She saves both of their lives by using a campfire box to set off an explosion, destroying a bridge just before the Mayor's men had caught up to her and Todd.

She is introduced in The Knife of Never Letting Go when Todd 'hears' her silence, as she has no Noise. She is the first female he has seen (excluding the women he saw when he was young, which he can't remember). At the beginning, she is still in shock from the crash and the loss of her parents; she doesn't speak to Todd, and, combined with her lack of Noise, this causes him to wonder whether she feels any emotions at all. After Todd helps her escape from Aaron, she tells Todd her name. They begin to cooperate with each other as she shares items from her bag with him to assist them on their journey. She travelled with Todd to Haven in hopes of finding a communication tower, intent on sending a message back to the settlers’ main ship. She was disappointed to learn that New World lacks this technology, and is later averted from this goal by Mayor Prentiss.

In The Ask and the Answer, she becomes a POV character along with Todd. The two are separated as Todd is under the Mayor's control, while she is sent to the house of healing. There she meets Mistress Coyle, a fearsome and calculating healer who is also the leader of a resistance army against the Mayor's group. As Viola becomes further entrenched into the workings of The Answer, she learns how to heal, set off bombs, and how to negotiate in war.

In the final book, she comes close to death, infected by the virus Mayor Prentiss placed in all the metal bands. She also meets Bradley, her teacher and friend from her ship, when he and Simone land on New World for a scouting mission. Viola starts the Spackle war for Todd by launching a missile from the scout ship, and realizes that she will kill for Todd, noting that it is a dangerous thing. She and Todd finally kiss towards the end of the novel.

Relatives and Allies

Ben Moore
Ben is Todd's adoptive father who was a friend of his mother's. He and Cillian raised Todd and helped him escape when he discovered that it was possible to escape the Noise. He later rejoined him and told him and Viola the truth about Prentisstown, how the men killed all the women because they couldn't read their thoughts. When they were found by Mayor Prentiss's men, Ben was seemingly killed by Davy Prentiss Jr.

He was revealed to be alive in Monsters of Men and was essential in redeeming the Return from his lust for revenge. Ben was changed from his resurrection and could speak the Spackle language which led him to prefer to speak through his Noise. His return to Todd was the straw that broke the filial bond that the latter had formed with the Mayor and helped bring his Noise back, healing his broken relationship with Viola. Ben, along with Viola and Bradley, negotiated peace with the new Sky when the Mayor ordered his remaining troops to destroy the Answer.

Ben is the origin of the phrase "War makes monsters out of men" which was taken up several times in the trilogy and was the title base of the third book.

It is implied that Ben and Cillian were more than friends when 1017/The Return/The Sky refers to Cillian as Ben's 'One In Particular'. A romantic relationship is also confirmed by Ness in several interviews.

Cillian Boyd
Cillian Boyd (kil-i-an) is Todd's other adoptive father, and a good friend of Todd's parents. He and Ben raise Todd after Todd's parents died. Cillian was convinced by Ben to come to New World, and he farms wheat and sheep. Cillian originally wanted to fight against the men of Prentisstown when they were killing the women, but Ben pacified him, arguing that they must pretend to go along with Prentiss so they could look after Todd. It is evident throughout the story that both Ben and Cillian are torn by guilt of essentially letting Todd's mother be murdered. He and Todd fight a lot, but according to Ben, this is because he cares about him. Cillian sacrifices himself in order to give Todd time to escape. Todd doesn't get along with Cillian as well as he does with Ben, but he still cares for him very much. According to Todd, Cillian's Noise is usually a reddish colour.

Manchee
Manchee is Todd’s pet dog. A gift from Cillian for Todd’s twelfth birthday, his thoughts are audible because of the Noise germ. Most of his dialogue consists of questions or simple words and declarations, such as "Squirrel!" or "Poo, Todd." He was Todd’s closest friend, and follows Todd unconditionally after they escape Prentisstown. When Todd is attacked in vengeance by Matthew Lyle, Manchee defends him at the cost of a large chunk of his tail. In The Knife of Never Letting Go, a plan hatched by Todd goes horribly wrong, and Todd is unable to stop Aaron from killing him. After his death, Todd finds himself unable to ever intentionally separate himself from any of his allies, as he fears that once again, it might result in tragic consequences that they will all regret.

Bradley Tench
The caretaker of the Beta, one of the ships of the convoy. He lands on New World with Simone in a scout ship to survey for possible town locations, because the convoy is under the assumption that the first ship didn't make it to New World due to a lack of communication. He is very disoriented by the Noise bug, especially when it reveals his love for Simone involuntarily, and blames Todd for her death. He is an unswayable advocate for peace during the negotiations between himself, the Mayor and Mistress Coyle, as well as between the humans and the Spackle, earning himself the nickname 'the humanitarian' among the Mayor's soldiers.

Simone Watkins
The caretaker of the Gamma, one of the ships of the convoy. She is killed when Mistress Coyle commits suicide in her attempt to kill the Mayor. Todd could have saved her, but he subconsciously chose to save the Mayor instead. She is a very capable with piloting machinery and negotiations, and she was going to teach Viola more about survival before her scout ship was deployed. She learns about Bradley's feelings for her when he develops Noise, but avoids the issue.

The Ask
Prominent characters who are members of Mayor Prentiss' army, The Ask. When the Mayor takes over Haven, the army becomes the largest force on New World, excepting the Spackle.

Mayor Prentiss/President David Prentiss

Mayor Prentiss is the mastermind behind the takeover, and later becomes self-proclaimed President of New World. He is the one who forced Prentisstown into War, and the one who plotted the start of the next Spackle war. He is extremely charismatic and manipulative, often choosing to play mind games instead of resorting to brute force. Although for most it is an annoyance, he learns to control his Noise, and can even use it as a weapon. Despite his cruelties, a running theme throughout the trilogy is whether or not he can be redeemed.

In the second book, he creates the Ask, an organization dedicated to opposing the Answer and destroying unrest within the population of Haven. He also captures Todd and forces him to work with him. Mayor Prentiss dislikes his son Davy and frequently comments on how Todd would make for a better son. At the end of the second book, Prentiss kills Davy. It is later revealed that he would have sent Davy into war with an empty rifle. Todd and Viola have the Mayor at their mercy for a brief period of time, and just before they are about to end his life, the Spackle launch a surprise retaliation. He is released so that he can lead his army to defend the humans from the incoming war.

In the third book, Mayor Prentiss continues to try to recruit Todd but is instead changed by him. He becomes more moral, but cannot ignore the hollow emptiness he feels towards everything in the world. It is revealed that he had surpassed a point in his knowledge of Noise that has left him completely silenced and hateful of others’ Noise. He treats Todd as if he were his own son, but when Ben arrives, he realizes that Todd will choose to be more like Ben instead of him. In Monsters of Men, Todd tries to kill him by using his Noise to force him to walk into the ocean, where enormous man-eating sea creatures dwell. However, the Mayor declares that he has changed due to Todd's goodness, and he does not want Todd to become like him by killing him. Declaring that the world will be much changed by them and that he doesn't want to witness it, he walks into the ocean.

Davy Prentiss, Jr.
Son of Mayor Prentiss. In 'Old' Prentisstown, Davy was the local sheriff. In book one he is told to bring Todd and Viola to the Mayor, only he shoots Viola instead. Later, in the second book, he is ordered to work with Todd during The Ask and The Answer, carrying out tasks while constantly seeking his father’s approval. While initially he and Todd resent each other, they eventually develop a form of friendship during the Ask and the Answer. When Viola is being tortured, he saves her as Todd cannot. He is murdered by the end of The Ask and The Answer by his own father when he starts to turn out to be nice and 'human'. whilst he is dying, he also reveals to Todd through his Noise that he killed Ben, but regretted it later, and he begs Todd for forgiveness as he is about to die.

Aaron
The seemingly insane priest of Prentisstown. He constantly appears during the first book trying to provoke a fight with Todd, which always ends with Todd injuring him without killing him. His face is disfigured in the beginning of the book after being attacked by crocodiles and then later in the book, Aaron's nose is bitten off by Manchee, after Aaron attempted to attack Todd and Viola. At the end of the book, it's revealed that he was selected as the sacrifice for Todd's coming of age which requires him to kill someone in order to become a man, and Aaron has been trying to provoke Todd to kill him so that his aiding of the process will turn him into a saint. The plan ultimately fails, when at the end of the first book, Viola deliberately kills him in Todd's place to prevent Todd from becoming a murderer like Mayor Prentiss wants.

Ivan Farrow
A former civilian of Farbranch, Ivan joined the Mayor's army when his town is destroyed. He later joins the Answer after the Mayor demotes him to private and continuously treats him like dirt. He is an ambitious man who "goes wherever the power is", as is said by many characters of the novels.

The Answer
Characters who are part of Mistress Coyle's resistance army, The Answer.

Mistress Nicola Coyle
Mistress Coyle is the leader of the Answer. She sets up a camp away from Haven, committed to removing Mayor Prentiss from power. She enlists Viola’s help and shows members of the Answer how to set off homemade bombs. Although she does not resort to torture, she is just as manipulative and calculating as Mayor Prentiss. While she calls herself a freedom fighter, the members of The Ask label her as a terrorist. Despite being the head of an organization with just intentions, she is willing to do anything to end the Mayor's regime, even at the cost of sacrificing individual lives. When Viola escapes to find and help Todd, she sets her up with a bomb so that there's a chance that he could be caught in the explosion. In Monsters of Men, she kills herself in a final attempt to remove the Mayor from power and to possibly allow Viola to become a leader.

Wilf
A strange man who shows up periodically in the books. In his first appearance, he lets Todd and Viola ride on his cart as they navigate through a herd of an alien species similar to cattle. Viola tells him that their names are Ben and Hildy, to conceal their identities. Although he can tell that those are not their real names, he decides that it doesn't matter to him. Wilf can also hear in Todd's Noise that they are from Prentisstown, although unlike many other villagers that they run into, he does not react with fear and loathing. Despite his simple disposition, he has shown himself to be the most peaceful and honest man on New World, incapable of lies, and has been likened to the Sky of the Clearing.

Jane
Jane is Wilf's wife, though she does not share her husband's natural charisma. She helps the Mistresses at The Answer's camp.

Lee
A young soldier from the Answer, who falls in love with Viola during her stay with them. He eventually accepts that she will always love Todd, and helps her break him out of his cell during a major raid by the Answer. In the third book, his eyes are irreversibly damaged by a Spackle acid rifle, leaving him blind except for pictures in others' Noise. This does not stop him, however, from helping Todd and Viola during the Second Spackle War. He even leads the remaining soldiers who survived the destruction of New Prentisstown by the Spackle releasing the backed up river.

The Land
Although the human settlers called them the Spackle, their name for their species is simply the Land. Being a species that evolved with Noise, the entire population acts as one entity.

1017

1017 is a Spackle who grew up domesticated in Haven. He is introduced in The Ask and the Answer. Forced to work for a violent owner, he falls in love with his ‘one in particular’, the other Spackle in the household. However the other Spackle is killed whilst trying to protect 1017, and 1017 grows angry and vengeful, directing this hate at Todd (known to him as The Knife) because Todd witnesses the killing and torture of Spackle, and though he knows what is happening is wrong, he does nothing to stop it.
 
When all of the Burden are killed, 1017 is left and runs to the Land, and is named The Return. He then urges the Sky to kill all humans, and lets his need for revenge control him. However, the Sky leads him to Ben and he learns that he cannot kill.

When he becomes the new Sky, he almost wages war on all settlers, but stops short because he realises he is not doing what is right for the Land. With the knowledge that only peace can bring calamity, he lets the humans go.

At the end of Monsters of Men, he shoots Todd with acid, though he knew he wasn’t sure if it was Todd or the Mayor in front of him. He offers to be killed by Viola as punishment, because he suffers knowing he killed another person, but Viola refuses to kill him as well as denying him forgiveness, so he will regret his action for the rest of his life.

He shelters Todd and offers Viola medicine, in a gesture of peace.

The Sky
An appointed head of the Spackle, who has supreme rule over all Spackle affairs. A separate entity to the Land, who is alone, and must do what is right for the Land, not what is right by them. Orders from the Sky are followed unconditionally.
The original Sky is killed in Monsters of Men, when the Mayor burns down the forest. Whilst dying, he chooses 1017 to be the new Sky.

The Burden
The name for those who were left to become domesticated slaves for the humans after the signing of the first treaty. Often regarded with remorse and guilt when remembered among Spackles. The Mayor kills them all to provoke another war with the Spackle.

The Clearing
The Spackle name for humans, due to their destructive nature.

Other
Various other citizens of New World, including members from towns such as Farbranch, Carbonel Downs, and Haven.

Hildy
Mathilde (more commonly known as Hildy) is a citizen of Farbranch. Hildy built the bridge that Todd and Viola crossed to get away from Prentisstown. She and Tam are the first people that Todd and Viola meet after leaving the swamp, and Hildy is also the second female he has ever met. Todd mistakes her for a man when they first meet and is confused about her lack of Noise.

She is old enough to remember what life was like on Old World. It is hinted that she used to be one of the leaders of the town, although she seems to have stepped down from that role. Nonetheless, she still has much authority over the citizens of Farbranch. When Lyle was approaching Todd with hostility, she commanded him to step down, and he obeyed without her having to use any force. She built the bridge that connects Prentisstown to the rest of New World, and guards it every day in case someone tries to cross it. Her sister is the deputy mayor of Farbranch, although it is suggested that Hildy herself is the mayor. She and Tam came to New World on the first settler ship. Their house is made from the ship that they came down in, an Expansion X Three 200 that they remodeled to look like a swan. When talking about their home, Hildy mentions that she was an engineer. Hildy has lived on Old World so her parents weren't caretakers on the settler ship.

Tam
Tam is the husband of Hildy. He has a much more docile, relaxed personality compared to his wife, but they both welcome Todd and Viola into their home. He and Hildy are very close.

Mayor Jessica Elizabeth
Jessica Elizabeth was the Mayor of New Elizabeth, which was renamed Prentisstown after her death. She predicted that the men would attack the women of New Elizabeth and she organised some girls and younger boys to leave through the swamp. She intended to go across the swamp and escape with all of the women and the men who didn't want to kill them, but the rest of the men attacked before this could occur. She perished with the rest of the women of New Elizabeth.

Mayor Con Ledger
The former mayor of Haven, before Mayor Prentiss took over. He is introduced at the beginning of the second book. He shared Todd's cell with him, and gradually gave him information about the Answer, the Spackle War, and recent events. It is later revealed that Ledger was supplying Mayor Prentiss with all the information Todd gave him in return. He attempts to recapture Todd during his escape attempt with Viola and Lee, but is killed when he takes a Thrace bomb from Viola's bag, placed there by Mistress Coyle in an attempt to kill the Mayor.

References

Novels
The Knife of Never Letting Go, Ness Patrick, Walker Books, 2008
The Ask and the Answer, Ness Patrick, Walker Books, 2009
Monsters of Men, Ness Patrick, Walker Books, 2010

Citations

Lists of literary characters